The 2018 Indiana State Sycamores football team represented Indiana State University in the 2018 NCAA Division I FCS football season. They were led by second-year head coach Curt Mallory and played their home games at Memorial Stadium. They were a member of the Missouri Valley Football Conference. They finished the season 7–4, 5–3 in MVFC play to finish in a tie for third place. Despite being ranked in the top 25 at the end of the regular season, they were not selected to participate in the FCS Playoffs.

Previous season
The Sycamores finished the 2017 season 0–11, 0–8 in MVFC play to finish in last place.

Preseason

Preseason MVFC poll
The MVFC released their preseason poll on July 29, 2018, with the Sycamores predicted to finish in last place.

Preseason All-MVFC Teams
The Sycamores placed six players on the preseason all-MVFC teams.

Offense

2nd team

Jerry Nunez – K

Defense

2nd team

Inoke Moala – DL

Derrek Tuszka – DL

Jonas Griffith – LB

Katrell Moss – LB

Rondell Green – DB

Schedule

Source: 2018 Schedule

Game summaries

Quincy

at Louisville

at Eastern Illinois

Northern Iowa

at South Dakota State

Missouri State

at Southern Illinois

at Youngstown State

South Dakota

Illinois State

at Western Illinois

Ranking movements

References

Indiana State
Indiana State Sycamores football seasons
Indiana State Sycamores football